The Progressive Party was an Australian political party, active in New South Wales state politics. The question of tariff policy which, had created and divided the Free Trade Party and Protectionist Party in New South Wales in the 1890s, became a federal issue at the time of federation. Deprived of their main ideological difference, the two parties were recreated as the Liberal Reform Party aligned with the federal Free Trade Party and the Progressive Party aligned with the federal Protectionist Party.

There was a rapid decline in the parliamentary representation of the party, from a high of forty-two seats at the 1901 election, to sixteen at the 1904 election, In April and May 1907 the party had negotiated a coalition agreement with the Liberal Reform Party but this was rejected by a vote of parliamentary members. The party leader Thomas Waddell resigned and joined the Liberal Reform Party, and was followed by John McFarlane, Brinsley Hall, John Gillies and John Perry. Of the remaining ten former Progressive Party members, a further five lost their seats at the 1907 election, 

In 1919, the Farmers' and Settlers' Association and the Graziers' Association founded a new Progressive Party, which, while not a direct successor, included members of the former party such as George Briner and Walter Bennett. The new party won metropolitan and rural seats in the 1920 election and was a forerunner to the Country Party.

Leaders

State election results

References

Defunct political parties in New South Wales
Political parties established in 1901
1901 establishments in Australia
Political parties disestablished in 1907
1907 disestablishments in Australia